Diacylglycerol kinase gamma is an enzyme that in humans is encoded by the DGKG gene.

This gene encodes an enzyme that is a member of the type I subfamily of diacylglycerol kinases, which are involved in lipid metabolism. These enzymes generate phosphatidic acid by catalyzing the phosphorylation of diacylglycerol, a fundamental lipid second messenger that activates numerous proteins, including protein kinase C isoforms, Ras guanyl nucleotide-releasing proteins and some transient receptor potential channels. Diacylglycerol kinase gamma has been implicated in cell cycle regulation and in the negative regulation of macrophage differentiation in leukemia cells. Multiple transcript variants encoding different isoforms have been found for this gene.

References

Further reading

EF-hand-containing proteins